Matlack is a surname, and may refer to:

James Matlack (1775-1840), Representative from New Jersey
Jon Matlack (born 1950), Major League Baseball pitcher
Ruth Matlack (born 1931),  All-American Girls Professional Baseball League player
Timothy Matlack (c.1730-1829), merchant, surveyor, architect, statesman and patriot in the American Revolution
White Matlack (1745-1824), New York Quaker and abolitionist

Surnames